The 1961 Major League Baseball season was played from April 10 to October 12, 1961. That season saw the New York Yankees defeat the Cincinnati Reds in five games in the World Series. The season is best known for Yankee teammates Roger Maris' and Mickey Mantle's pursuit of Babe Ruth's prestigious 34-year-old single-season home run record of 60. Maris ultimately broke the record when he hit his 61st home run on the final day of the regular season, while Mantle was forced out of the lineup in late September due to a hip infection and finished with 54 home runs.

In response to the proposed Continental League, the American League expanded by two teams in the first MLB expansion since 1901. The original Washington Senators moved to Minnesota and became the Minnesota Twins. The American League therefore placed a new team in Washington, also called the Senators. Also, the American League placed a team in Los Angeles called the Los Angeles Angels.

In order to keep its schedule balanced, the American League season was extended by eight games. Previously, teams had played 154 games (22 games per opponent), but from 1961 AL teams would play opponents 18 times each for a total of 162 games. The National League played a 154-game schedule for the final time in 1961 before switching to 162 games when they also expanded to ten teams for the 1962 Major League Baseball season.

Standings

American League

National League

Postseason

Bracket

Awards and honors

Major Awards

Gold Glove Awards

League leaders

All-Star Games

Game 1

Game 2

The game ended in a 1–1 tie due to rain.

Managers

American League

National League

Records

Major League
Home runs, single-season: 61, Roger Maris, New York Yankees
Maris' 61 home runs broke Babe Ruth's 34-year-old major league single-season record of 60, set in 1927.  Maris' record would stand for 37 years until it was broken by Mark McGwire's 70 in 1998.  Maris’ American League record would stand for a total of 61 years until it was eclipsed by Aaron Judge’s 62 in 2022.

Home Field Attendance

Events
January 29 – Billy Hamilton and Max Carey are voted into the Hall of Fame by the Veterans Committee.
April 11 – At New York's Yankee Stadium, the Minnesota Twins, in their first game since their move from Washington, shut out the Yankees 6–0. The Twins' Pedro Ramos was the winning pitcher. Ramos had a 2-run single and allowed just 3 singles in beating the Yankee starting pitcher, Whitey Ford.
April 21 – The Minnesota Twins play their very first home game in franchise history, losing to the team that coincidentally replaced them in the nation's capital, the Washington Senators 5–3.
April 22 – The Boston Red Sox snap a 13-game losing streak in Chicago's Comiskey Park by edging the Chicago White Sox 7–6 on Pumpsie Green's 11th-inning home run.
April 27 – The Los Angeles Angels draw a disappointing crowd of 11,931 for their first-ever home opener against the Minnesota Twins at Los Angeles' Wrigley Field. Ty Cobb, in his last appearance at a ball park, throws out the first ball. The Twins' Camilo Pascual spoils the opener by winning, 4–2, sending the Angels to their eighth loss in nine games.
April 30 – San Francisco Giants slugger Willie Mays became the ninth player to hit four home runs in a single game as the Giants beat the Milwaukee Braves 14–4 at Milwaukee's County Stadium.
May 31 – Boston Red Sox outfielder Carroll Hardy pinch-hits for rookie Carl Yastrzemski. On September 20, 1960, Hardy pinch hit for Ted Williams, making him the only player to go in for both future Hall of Famers. Hardy also hit his first major league home run pinch-hitting for Roger Maris when both were at Cleveland (May 18, 1958).
June 8 – In the course of a 10–8 loss to the Cincinnati Reds, the Milwaukee Braves become the first team to hit 4 home runs in consecutive at bats.
June 29 – Willie Mays hits three home runs, helping his San Francisco Giants beat the Philadelphia Phillies 8–7.
July 3 - Sandy Koufax is tagged out when attempting to steal home base for the Los Angeles Dodgers against the Milwaukee Braves - the only time he attempted to steal a base in his career.
July 4 – Willie Mays hits his 300th career home run.
July 11 – Strong winds at Candlestick Park dominate the first All-Star Game of the season. A capacity crowd sees Giants pitcher Stu Miller blown off the mound in the ninth inning when a balk is called, and it enables the American League to forge a 3–3 tie before losing 5–4 in 10 innings.
July 17 – Commissioner Ford Frick decrees that Babe Ruth's record of 60 home runs in a 154-game schedule in 1927 "cannot be broken unless some batter hits 61 or more within his club's first 154 games." Two days later, Frick, an old friend of Ruth, announces that should Ruth's record be beaten after 154 games, the record will carry an asterisk. When asked about the ruling, Roger Maris replies, "A season is a season."  This is also the day that one of baseball's greatest hitters passes away, Ty Cobb, aged 74.
July 31 – At Fenway Park, the second All-Star Game of the year ends in a 1–1 tie as heavy rain halted play. It is the first of two ties in All-Star history.  The other would occur in 2002.
August 11 – Warren Spahn of the Milwaukee Braves records his 300th career win.
August 20 – The Philadelphia Phillies snap a modern-day record 23-game losing streak, defeating the Milwaukee Braves 7–4 in the second game of a doubleheader at Milwaukee County Stadium. Phillie pitcher John Buzhardt goes the distance for the victory; he had also been the winning pitcher in the Phillies' last victory prior to the start of the losing streak, on July 28 against the San Francisco Giants.
August 22 – Roger Maris becomes the first player to hit his 50th home run of the season in the month of August as the Yankees lose to the Los Angeles Angels, 4–3. Angels pitcher Ken McBride tees up the gopher ball in the sixth inning with one on.
August 23 – At Cincinnati's Crosley Field, the Giants hit five home runs in a 12-run ninth inning, beating the Cincinnati Reds 14–0.
September 1 – The Baltimore Orioles' Paul Richards resigned as manager to become the new General Manager of the new Houston National League club. The club would be known as the Houston Colt .45s. Lum Harris takes over as manager of the Orioles.
September 2 – Milwaukee Braves manager Chuck Dressen (71–58) is fired and executive vice president Birdie Tebbetts becomes the new Braves manager.
September 20 – Helped by home runs by Yogi Berra and Roger Maris, the New York Yankees defeat the Baltimore Orioles 4–2, clinching their second straight American League pennant and 11th in 13 years. The Yankees would finish with a 109–53 record, tying the 1969 Orioles for the best won-loss record of the decade.
September 26
The Cincinnati Reds clinch their first National League pennant since 1940. Homers by Frank Robinson and pinch hitter Jerry Lynch (a tie breaker in the eighth inning) give the Reds an 8–3 win over the Chicago Cubs at Wrigley Field.
Roger Maris hits his major league record-tying 60th home run of the season, a third-inning solo shot against Jack Fisher of the Baltimore Orioles.
October 1 – Before a small crowd at Yankee Stadium, Roger Maris smacks a 2–0 pitch from Boston's Tracy Stallard into the right field stands for his 61st home run of the season, setting a new major league record for home runs in a season. The record will stand until Mark McGwire of the St. Louis Cardinals breaks it in 1998.
October 9 – In Game 5 of the World Series, Johnny Blanchard and Héctor López spark a five-run first inning and 13–5 win for the New York Yankees over the Cincinnati Reds. Blanchard and López hit home runs, and López drives in five runs. Bud Daley's long relief effort wraps up the Series, as Ralph Houk becomes the third rookie manager to guide a World Series winner. Whitey Ford is named the Series MVP.

See also
1961 Nippon Professional Baseball season

References

External links
1961 Major League Baseball season schedule

 
Major League Baseball seasons